Greg Droman is an American record producer, mixing and audio engineer. He has made hit singles and albums for some of the biggest artists in pop, rock, and country music.

He has been Grammy and ACM nominated, winning an CMA as producer for Album of the Year.

He is married with singer and songwriter Marilyn Martin, for whom he produced and mixed her latest album, Trust, Love, Pray.

Artists that Droman has mixed, produced or engineered
 Marilyn Martin (Trust, Love, Pray, 2012)
 Fleetwood Mac
 Lindsey Buckingham
 Kate Voegele
 Faith Hill
 Gary Allan
 Jen Foster
 Trisha Yearwood
 Los Lonely Boys
 Lee Ann Womack
 Jace Everett
 Jude Cole
 Emmylou Harris
 Delbert McClinton
 Brooks & Dunn
 Jennifer Hanson
 Ashley Monroe
 Keith Gattis
 Randy Houser
 Jessi Alexander
 Danielle Brisebois
 Josh Turner
 Joe Nichols
 Gretchen Wilson
 Chris Knight
 Bruce Robison
 Joe Walsh
 Joe Vitale

References

Living people
American record producers
American male musicians
Place of birth missing (living people)
Year of birth missing (living people)
American rock musicians
American audio engineers